Euran Pallo (abbreviated EuPa) is a football club from Eura, Finland. The club was formed in 1954 and their home ground is at the Euran Wembley.   The men's first team currently plays in the Kolmonen (Third Division).

Background
Euran Pallo was established in 1954 by taking over the football section of the existing Euran Raiku sports club.

EuPa spent many seasons in the lower divisions of the Finnish football league in their early history.  However the club's fortunes changed dramatically at the end of the 1990 season when EuPa gained promotion to the Kakkonen (Second Division) for the first time.  There followed the best period in the club's history with 10 consecutive seasons in the third tier of Finnish football, the Kakkonen (Second Division) from 1991 to 2000. The club then dropped back into the Kolmonen (Third Division) in 2001 where they have stayed for the last decade with the exception of a short-lived season in the Kakkonen in 2004.  It is not proving easy for EuPa to regain their previous status as they have finished in second place in 4 of the last 5 seasons.

EuPa play their home matches at the "Euran Wembley" adjacent to the artificial turf pitch at the OP-Areena. The home attendance record for a EuPa match is 1,452 spectators who attended a Round 7 Finnish Cup match against RoPS in 1990.

The most famous players to have turned out in EuPa's colours are Ari Valvee, the former Finnish international and Micah Hyde.

Season to season

Club Structure

Euran Pallo run a large number of teams including 2 men's team, 1 ladies team, 2 men's veterans team, 5 boys teams and 4 girls teams.  A popular event run by the club each summer is the Nordea Liiga, a league competition for young boys and girls.

2010 season

EuPa Men's Team are competing in the Kolmonen (Third Division) section administered by the Satakunta SPL and Tampere SPL.  This is the fourth highest tier in the Finnish football system.  In 2010 EuPa finished in 3rd place in the Kolmonen.

EuPa /2 are participating in the Nelonen (Fourth Division) section administered by the Satakunta SPL.

References and sources
Official Website
Finnish Wikipedia
Suomen Cup
 Euran Pallo M1 Facebook

Footnotes

Football clubs in Finland
Pallo
1954 establishments in Finland